Trupanea flavivena is a species of tephritid or fruit flies in the genus Trupanea of the family Tephritidae.

Distribution
Costa Rica.

References

Tephritinae
Insects described in 1937
Diptera of South America